

Harbor Patrol 

Long Beach Harbor Patrol officers are highly trained, armed public officers dedicated to the public safety and physical security of the Port. Appointed as Public Officers under California penal code 836.5 by the City of Long Beach.  Long Beach Harbor Patrol Officers are empowered to enforce provisions of the Long Beach Port Tariff and certain vehicle and penal codes, they provide a necessary and vital connection to real time events in the Harbor.

The (LBHP) Long Beach Harbor Patrol works in partnership with the LBPD's Port Police Division to protect the Port.

Within the harbor district the Harbor Patrol maintains a high-visibility patrol and responds to a wide variety of calls. These include, but are not limited to: Emergency, non-emergency crimes, traffic accidents, explosions, HazMat, terrorism and industrial accidents. The Harbor Patrol also ensures that terminals are compliant with United States Coast Guard security requirements.

The Harbor Patrol provides a wide variety of services above and beyond land-based patrol, including its own boat, commercial dive team, and officers specializing in physical security and technical surveillance systems.

History 
Long Beach police Port division was established on December 17, 2001 following the terrorist attack of September 11, 2001. The Port of Long Beach, being the second largest port in the United States makes this port essential to the US economy. The port requires 24-hour, 7-day-per-week enforcement whether that may be on land, sea, or air.

Principles 
Safety and security are the main priorities for the Port of Long Beach. With the attacks of September 11, 2001, the port and various government agencies have reacted proactively to ensure that security is addressed adequately and efficiently to protect the port. Long Beach Harbor patrol take pride in the role of developing strategies to mitigate security risks. Harbor Patrol works closely with both public and private agencies to plan and coordinate security measures.

Port Security 
The port uses different sources of law enforcement to keep the port safe which include Homeland Security, Long Beach Police Department, and the Port Security Unit. Unlike the Los Angeles County's coastal patrol; which operate under Sheriff's Department and LAPD harbor division, Long Beach Harbor Patrol have their own police.

Duties 

The duties involved include working closely with homeland security and United States Coast Guard. The main priority is keep the port safe from land, sea and air. The Long Beach Harbor Patrol is always looking to bring in individuals interested in careers in homeland security.

Other duties include the enforcement of sections of the California Penal and Vehicle Codes, the Long Beach Municipal Code and the Port of Long Beach Tariff/Ordinances; investigate and apprehend or detain persons suspected of illegal activity.

 Monitor all vessels and train movement
 Monitor public and commercial traffic
 Construct traffic controls
 Construct vessel smoke emissions
 Inquire and completes emission enforcement reports
 Respond to request for services such as:
 disturbance
 crime calls
 traffic accidents
 hazmat occurrences
 medical aid request
 public safety incidents
 Act as a boat crewman to assist with special vessel operations
 Impound private owned vehicles
 Perform drayage and wharfage follow-up
 Generate appropriate logs, reports and notifications
 Monitor closed-circuit television (CCTV) systems
 Perform access control duties
 Operate screening technology
 Interact with Port Tenants
 Commercial trade visitors
 government agencies
 general public

See also 

 List of law enforcement agencies in California

References

External links 

 Long Beach Harbor Patrol official website

Long Beach, California